Animal attacks are violent attacks caused by non-human animals against humans, one of the most common being bites. These attacks are a cause of human injuries and fatalities worldwide. According to the 2012 U.S. Pet Ownership & Demographics Sourcebook, 56% of United States citizens owned a pet. In the United States in 1994, approximately 4.7 million people were bitten by dogs. The frequency of animal attacks varies with geographical location, as well as hormonal secretion. Gonad glands found on the anterior side of the pituitary gland secrete androgens and estrogens hormones. Animals with high levels of these hormones tend to be more aggressive, which leads to a higher frequency of attacks not only to humans but among themselves.  In the United States, a person is more likely to be killed by a domesticated dog than they are to die from being hit by lightning according to the National Safety Council.

Animal attacks have been identified as a major public health problem. In 1997, it was estimated that up to 2 million animal bites occur each year in the United States. Injuries caused by animal attacks result in thousands of fatalities worldwide every year. "Unprovoked attacks occur when the animal approaches and attacks a person(s) who is the principal attractant, for example, predation on humans ..." All causes of death are reported to the Centers for Disease Control and Prevention each year. Medical injury codes are used to identify specific cases. The World Health Organization uses identical coding, though it is unclear whether all countries keep track of animal-related fatalities. Though animals, excluding some tigers, do not regularly hunt humans, there is concern that these incidents are "bad for many species 'public image'."

Epidemiology and injuries 
Animal bites are the most common form of injury from animal attacks. The U.S. estimated annual count of animal bites is 250,000 human bites, 1 to 2 million dog bites, 400,000 cat bites, and 45,000 bites from snakes. Bites from skunks, horses, squirrels, rats, rabbits, pigs, and monkeys may be up to one percent of bite injuries. Unprovoked pet ferret attacks have caused serious facial injuries. Non-domesticated animals, although assumed to be more common, especially as a cause of rabies infection, make up less than one percent of reported bite wounds. Bites to the right arm are the most likely due to defensive reactions when the victim uses their dominant arm. The most common location for fatal bites is on the individual's head. It is estimated that three-quarters of bites to humans are to the arms or legs. Bites to the face constitute only ten percent of total bites. Children aged ten and younger suffer two-thirds of reported bite injuries. Bite injuries are often the result of an animal attack, including instances when a human attacks another human. Human bites are the third most frequent type of bite after dog and cat bites. Dog bites are commonplace, with children the most frequently bitten and the face and scalp the most common targets.

Infections 
Animal bites carry an increased risk of infection due to their exposure to rabies and different bacteria that animals have in their oral cavity. Microbiological studies are carried out to determine some of these infections. Frequently these infections are polymicrobial with different mixtures of aerobic and anaerobic microorganisms. Some of the bacteria identified by the remains that are maintained in the bites and by exposure to other variables and change of physical environment are: Pasturella spp., Streptococcus, Staphylococcus, Moraxella, Corynebacterium, Neisseria, Fusobacterium, Bacteroides, Posphuomonoa, Capnocytophaga canimorsus, and Prevotella.

Treatments 
Treatment for those who have been attacked depends on the injuries. Though trauma may be addressed first, subsequent infections are also treated with appropriate antibiotics. The use of prophylactic antibiotics can significantly reduce the risk of a serious infection in the lesion. It is important to visit a doctor if the bite is severe. Up to three-quarters of dog bites happen to those younger than 20 years old. In the United States, the costs associated with dog bites are estimated at over $1 billion annually. The age groups that suffer most from dog bites are children 5 to 9 years old. Often bites go unreported and receive no medical treatment. Up to one percent of pediatric emergency room visits are for animal bites. This is more frequent during the summer months. Up to five percent of children receiving emergency care for dog bites are hospitalized. Bites typically occur in the late afternoon and early evening. Girls are bitten more frequently by cats than by dogs, while boys are bitten by dogs two times more often than are girls. To prevent serious and even fatal infections, rabies vaccines for both humans and animals are recommended, even if the person is not directly exposed to the infection. In addition, it is essential to know and consider the probability of transmission, the animal that caused the bite, the type and severity of the injury, and the age and overall health of the victim. In 1936, amputation was required in a third of cases in which treatment was delayed for 24 hours or longer.

Medical codes for animal attacks 
Injuries resulting from encounters with animals occur with sufficient frequency to require the use of medical codes by clinicians and insurance companies to document such encounters. The ICD-10-CM Diagnosis Codes are used for the purpose of clearly identifying diseases, their causes, injuries in the United States. Clinicians use these codes to quantify the medical condition and its causes and to bill insurance companies for the treatment required as a result of encounters with animals.

Notable deaths

See also 
 2010 Sharm el-Sheikh shark attacks
 2013 New Brunswick python attack
 CrocBITE
 Fatal dog attacks in the United States
 Jersey Shore shark attacks of 1916
 Kali River goonch attacks
 Kenton Joel Carnegie wolf attack
 List of deadliest animals to humans
 St. James Davis Chimpanzee Attack

References

Further reading
 Anderson, Knenneth, et al., "The Man-Eater of Jowlagiri", from Nine Man-Eaters and One Rogue, 1955
 Anitei, Stefan. "The Limits of the Human Nose: How much can a human smell?" Softpedia. 22 January 2007. 17 November 2008.
 Batin, Christopher. "Bear Attacks!" Outdoor Life 210.6 (2003): 46.
 Brandt, Anthony. "Attack". Outdoor Life 197.1 (1996): 52.
 Cardall, Taylor Y. and Peter Rosen. "Grizzly Bear Attack". The Journal of Emergency Medicine 24.3 (2003): 331–333.
 Driscoll, Jamus. "Bears on the Rampage". Outdoor Life 197.2 (1996): 20.
 Egerton, L. ed. 2005. Encyclopedia of Australian wildlife. Reader's Digest 
 Fergus, Charles. Wild Guide: Bears. Mechanisburg, PA; Stackpole Books, 2005.
 Guo, Shuzhong, et al., "Human facial allotransplantation: a 2-year follow-up study". The Lancet 372.9639 (2008): 631–638.
 Masterson, Linda. Living with Bears. Masonville, CO; PixyJack Press, LLC, 2006.
 Linnell, John D.C., et al.,The Fear of Wolves – review of wolf attacks on humans
 Ward, Paul and Suzanne Kynaston. Wild Bears of the World. United Kingdom: Cassell plc, 1995
 Whitman, David. "The Return of the Grizzly". Atlantic Monthly 286.3 (2000): 26–31.

External links 

 NCIPC bibliography of articles on dog bites Centers for Disease Control and Prevention
 Animal bites, World Health Organization
 CrocBITE
 

 
Animal killing
Canid attacks
Deer
Ethology
Human–wildlife conflict
Injuries
Snakes